Sermylia, or Sermyle (Σερμύλη), was a town of Chalcidice, between Galepsus and Mecyberna, which gave its name to the Toronaic Gulf, which was also called Sermylicus Sinus (κόλπος Σερμυλικός - kolpos Sermylikos). Pseudo Scylax writes that it was a Greek city. It was a member of the Delian League.

The site of Sermylia is near the modern Ormylia.

References

Populated places in ancient Macedonia
Former populated places in Greece
Greek colonies in Chalcidice
Members of the Delian League